Sindici is a surname. Notable people with the surname include:

Francesca Stuart Sindici (1858–1929), Spanish-Italian painter
Oreste Sindici (1828–1904), Italian-born Colombian musician and composer